Sir John Mellor, PC (1 January 1809 – 26 April 1887) was an English judge and Member of Parliament.

Life
Mellor was born in Hollinwood, Oldham and raised in Leicester, where his father was mayor and a Justice of the Peace.

As a young man, his Unitarian beliefs prevented Mellor attending university.  He entered law, becoming Queen's Counsel in 1833.  Following failed attempts in 1852 (at Warwick) and 1857 (at Coventry) he was elected to Parliament to represent Great Yarmouth in 1857, and Nottingham in 1859.  He was appointed to the Queen's Bench in 1861 and knighted in 1862.

Mellor was one of the two judges at the special commission set up in Manchester in 1867 to try those accused of the murder of Police Sergeant Charles Brett.

He was one of three judges at the 188-day long trial in 1873 of Arthur Orton, the Tichborne claimant.  In his description of the case, James Beresford Atlay described him as 'second to none amongst the Common Law judges'.  Hamilton notes he 'often amused the jury with his dry humour'.

Mellor retired in 1879 and was raised to the Privy Council.  He died at his London house in 1887 and was buried at Kingsdown, Kent.

Family
Mellor and his wife Elizabeth (née Moseley) had eight sons. Sir James Robert Mellor (1839–1926), the third son, was noted as a lawyer and polo player.

Arms

References

Further reading

External links 
 

1809 births
1887 deaths
Liberal Party (UK) MPs for English constituencies
UK MPs 1857–1859
UK MPs 1859–1865
19th-century King's Counsel
Members of the Privy Council of the United Kingdom
Justices of the King's Bench
Knights Bachelor
Politics of the Borough of Great Yarmouth
Politics of Nottingham
Queen's Bench Division judges